Ironmonger Row Baths were built as a public wash house and later upgraded to a Turkish Bath. They are located at Ironmonger Row, in the St Luke's district, near Old Street, Islington, London.

Description
The baths include a steam room, a Victorian-style Turkish bath comprising a series of three hot rooms of varying temperature, marble slabs for massage and body scrubbing and an icy plunge pool. In addition there are two relaxation areas. The swimming pool is 100 feet (slightly over 30 metres) long. There is a small sauna next to the pool, as well as a well equipped modern gym located within the building. There is also a communal laundry facility (launderette) in the building.

Extensive renovations to the entire building were carried out between May 2010 and December 2012. A fire in December 2021 destroyed one of the restored saunas and caused damage to the basement of the building.

The facility operates numerous programs, including a branch of the Tom Daley Diving Academy.

History
The baths were designed by architects AWS & KMB Cross, and built in 1931. They have been managed by Greenwich Leisure Limited (GLL) since the 2012 refurbishment.

From just after the Second World War until the new complex at Crystal Palace was built in the late 60s, the baths were the home of the world-famous Highgate Diving Club, who held their club night there every Friday and also met during the public sessions on Saturday mornings. The Olympic diver, Brian Phelps (Bronze medal – Highboard diving in 1960 Olympics) trained there regularly with his coach, Wally Orner, as did many of the club's international and Olympic divers, such as John Chandler, John Cooze, John Miles, Billy Wood, and Alun Roberts.

It was listed grade II in November 2006 and is located within St. Luke's Conservation Area.

Timeline

Archival records

Islington Local History Centre holds plans, photographs and commemorative material related to Ironmonger Row Baths.

References

External links

Entry in Victorian Turkish Baths

Grade II listed buildings in the London Borough of Islington
Swimming venues in London
Public baths in the United Kingdom
Tourist attractions in the London Borough of Islington